Early Morning Migration is a minimal electronic album created by Anticipate and Microcosm label-head Ezekiel Honig with Morgan Packard. The album is Honig's third release.

Track listing
"Tropical Ridges" (Ezekiel Honig) – 4:16
"Balm" (Morgan Packard) – 2:29
"Window Nature" (Honig) – 2:19
"Hibernate" (Packard) – 3:41
"A Lake of Suggestions Part 1" (Honig) – 4:19
"Billow" (Packard) – 4:47
"White on White" (Packard, Phil Salathé) – 4:37
"Planting Broken Branches Part 1" (Honig) – 4:48
"Planting Broken Branches Part 2" (Honig) – 6:10
"A Lake of Suggestions" (Honig) – 4:26
"A Long Time Ago" (Packard) – 10:38

Personnel
Michael Fossenkemper – mastering
Ernie Mills – trombone on track seven

External links
Ezekiel Honig's website
Morgan Packard's website
Microcosm Music's website

2005 albums
Ezekiel Honig albums